is a former international table tennis player from Japan.

Table tennis career
From 1967 to 1977 he won many medals in singles, doubles, and team events in the World Table Tennis Championships and in the Asian Table Tennis Championships.

The eleven World Championship medals included three gold medals in the men's singles at the 1977 World Table Tennis Championships and the men's team events at the 1967 World Table Tennis Championships and 1969 World Table Tennis Championships.

See also
 List of table tennis players
 List of World Table Tennis Championships medalists

References

External links
Mitsuru Kohno (the fourth photograph from the top) / Ryokuseikai (Alumni Association of Senshu University Table Tennis Team 

Japanese male table tennis players
Asian Games medalists in table tennis
Table tennis players at the 1974 Asian Games
Medalists at the 1974 Asian Games
Asian Games gold medalists for Japan
Asian Games silver medalists for Japan
Asian Games bronze medalists for Japan